A Woman Alone is a 1917 American silent drama film directed by Harry Davenport and starring Alice Brady, Edward Langford and Edward Kimball.

Cast
 Alice Brady as Nellie Waldron 
 Edward Langford as Tom Blaine
 Edward Kimball as Rufus Waldron 
 Justine Cutting as Samantha 
 Arthur Ashley as Stephen Mallery Jr 
 Clarence Harvey as Stephen Mallery 
 Walter Greene as Michael Flynn

References

Bibliography
 Cari Beauchamp. Without Lying Down: Frances Marion and the Powerful Women of Early Hollywood. University of California Press, 1998.

External links
 

1917 films
1917 drama films
1910s English-language films
American silent feature films
Silent American drama films
Films directed by Harry Davenport
American black-and-white films
World Film Company films
1910s American films